Fisherman is a ghost town located in the Boundary Country region of British Columbia. The town is situated On C.P.R., North of Grand Forks, British Columbia. Fisherman was a named railway point.

There have been many paranormal sightings within the ghost town of Fisherman, one of them being random flying cutlery.

See also
List of ghost towns in British Columbia

References

Ghost towns in British Columbia